Gorenji Podboršt pri Veliki Loki is a small settlement in the hills northeast of Velika Loka in the Municipality of Trebnje in eastern Slovenia. The area is part of the historical region of Lower Carniola. The municipality is now included in the Southeast Slovenia Statistical Region.

Name
The name of the settlement was changed from Gorenji Podboršt to Gorenji Podboršt pri Veliki Loki in 1953.

References

External links
Gorenji Podboršt pri Veliki Loki at Geopedia

Populated places in the Municipality of Trebnje